Dragon Ball Z: Lord Slug, also known by its Japanese title , is a 1991 Japanese animated science fiction martial arts film and the fourth Dragon Ball Z feature film. It was originally released in Japan on March 9 between episodes 81 and 82 at the Toei Anime Fair as part of a double feature with the first Magical Tarurūto-kun film.

Plot

Gohan visits Piccolo and shows him a new tune he has learned to whistle. Due to his advanced Namekian hearing, this causes Piccolo pain so he angrily orders Gohan to stop when they both sense an approaching threat incoming from outer space. Bulma and her father discover that a meteor harboring lifeforms is heading toward the Earth and will destroy the planet upon impact. Amidst mass panic, Goku and Krillin rush to intercept the meteor and hope to push it away by blasting it with Kamehameha waves but they are both rendered unconscious by the force of the meteor but it seemingly explodes in orbit. A spaceship then lands in one of Earth's cities.

An army of humanoid alien soldiers exit the ship and declare the Earth under the rule of their leader, Lord Slug. The soldiers attack a group of civilians but Gohan arrives to defend them. From the ship, Lord Slug observes that Gohan has a magical Dragon Ball sewn onto his hat which he loses during the scuffle. After his henchmen render Gohan unconscious and reveal the plan to convert the planet into a biological spaceship, Slug appears and uses telepathy to read Bulma's mind and learns about her radar used for tracking the Dragon Balls. Slug's men successfully gather the Dragon Balls and summon the eternal dragon Shenron who grants Slug his wish for eternal youth. Slug's forces begin transforming the Earth which begins to cause life to perish across the planet. Goku and Krillin are revived by Yajirobe who gives them each a healing Senzu bean. Gohan meanwhile resumes his assault against Slug's army and is rescued by Piccolo. Piccolo kills the henchman Wings and Gohan is overwhelmed by Medamatcha leading to Piccolo being injured when he jumps in front of an energy blast intended to kill Gohan. Goku and Krillin arrive and Goku easily kills Medamatcha and Angila. Slug appears and is attacked by Krillin who is quickly dispatched. Goku fights Slug but is overwhelmed; in a moment of rage, Goku is seemingly able to access a portion of the Super Saiyan form.

Goku pummels Slug and breaks his arm. Before Goku's eyes, Slug rips his arm off and regrows it, and removes his helmet, revealing that he is actually a Namekian. Through telepathy, King Kai warns Goku that Slug is a Super Namekian, a bloodline of violent warriors obsessed with power who were banished from their home world. Slug assumes a giant form and begins to crush Goku between his massive hands. Piccolo intervenes to rescue Goku and before he is also crushed, tears off his own ears and calls out for Gohan to start whistling. The whistling deafens and weakens Slug, allowing Piccolo to transfer his remaining energy to Goku who powers up and manages to fly straight through Slug's abdomen and incapacitates him. Goku then ascends into the sky and begins preparing a Spirit Bomb in order to destroy the pods transforming the planet, but Slug manages to pursue him. Goku launches the Spirit Bomb at Slug which sends him hurtling into his own machines, killing him and saving the planet. Yajirobe heals everyone with Senzu beans as they celebrate their victory.

Cast

Music
OP (Opening Theme):
 "Cha-La Head-Cha-La"
 Lyrics by Yukinojō Mori
 Music by 
 Arranged by Kenji Yamamoto
 Performed by Hironobu Kageyama
IN (Insert Song):
 
 Lyrics by Dai Satō
 Music by 
 Arranged by Kenji Yamamoto
 Performed by Hajime Ueshiba
ED (Ending Theme):
 
 Lyrics by Dai Satō
 Music by 
 Arranged by Kenji Yamamoto
 Performed by Hironobu Kageyama with Shines

English dub soundtrack
The following songs were present in Funimation's in-house English adaptation of Lord Slug.

 Finger Eleven - "First Time"
 Dust for Life - "Dragonfly"
 Dust for Life - "Step Into the Light
 American Pearl - "Free Your Mind
 Deftones - "Elite"
 Boy Hits Car - "I'm a Cloud"
 Finger Eleven - "Drag You Down"
 Dust for Life - "Seed"
 American Pearl - "Automatic"
 Disturbed - "Fear"
 Boy Hits Car - "The Rebirth"
 Disturbed - "Stupify"
 Breaking Point - "Coming of Age"

Bruce Faulconer produced an alternate opening theme for this version (which would be replaced in the 2008 remastered version with another original track composed by Mark Menza) and the remaining pieces of background music were composed by Faulconer and Evan Jones. The Double Feature release contains an alternate audio track containing the English dub with original Japanese background music by Shunsuke Kikuchi, an opening theme of "Cha-La Head-Cha-La", and an ending theme of "There's a Genki-Dama in Bad Things!!".

Box office
At the Japanese box office, the film sold  tickets and grossed .

Releases
It was released on VHS in North America on August 7, 2001, and on DVD on September 4, 2001. It was later released in Double Feature set along with The Tree of Might (1990) for Blu-ray and DVD on September 16, 2008, both feature full 1080p format in HD remastered 16:9 aspect ratio and an enhanced 5.1 surround mix. The film was re-released to DVD in remastered thinpak collection on November 1, 2011, containing the first 5 Dragon Ball Z films.

Reception

Other companies
A third English version produced and released exclusively in Malaysia by Speedy Video, features an unknown voice cast.

Other English dubs were also made by French company AB Groupe. This company done for European markets which was released under the misspelt title Super Saiya Son Goku, and another one for a Malaysian VCD release by Speedy Video which had the title Super Saiya People, Goku. While the Malaysian dub's cast remains unknown, the AB Groupe dub was revealed to have been recorded by English-speaking actors based in France who have also done voices for animated television series such as Code Lyoko and Chris Colorado.

References

External links
 Official anime website of Toei Animation
 MyFavoriteGames - Movie Summary 
 
 

Lord Slug
1991 anime films
1991 films
Funimation
Films scored by Shunsuke Kikuchi
Toei Animation films